The General John T. Wilder House is a historic home located at 2027 Riverside Drive in Knoxville, Tennessee, United States. It was constructed by Union General John T. Wilder, leader of the 17th Indiana Volunteers (Lightning Brigade) who fought in the Civil War Battle of Chickamauga.

General Wilder built the home in 1904, presumably as a summer home since he already owned a home in the Fort Sanders neighborhood of Knoxville.  The home is on the National Register of Historic Places.

He was appointed by four U.S. Presidents (Grant, McKinley, Roosevelt and Taft) to administer pensions in East Tennessee. Along with his friend, Capt. Hiram S. Chamberlain of Knox County, he also purchased over 700 acres of land in Roane County, Tennessee. They founded Rockwood, Tennessee, and the Roane Iron Company. He also had interests in cement, mining and banking around Knoxville, as well as a hotel atop Roan Mountain, Tennessee.

References

External links
 National Register of Historic Places unofficial site
 Tennessee Encyclopedia Biography
 John T. Wilder Biographical Information
 John T. Wilder "Friendly Carpetbagger"

Houses in Knoxville, Tennessee
Houses on the National Register of Historic Places in Tennessee
National Register of Historic Places in Knoxville, Tennessee